Zimbabwe Express Airlines was an airline from Zimbabwe, that was operational between 1994 and 1999.  One of the 727-100s in the fleet was the 15th ever built.

References

Defunct airlines of Zimbabwe
Airlines established in 1994
Airlines disestablished in 1999
1994 establishments in Zimbabwe
Companies based in Harare